The Museum & Gallery, Inc. is currently located on the campus of Bob Jones University in Greenville, South Carolina. It was established in 1951, and focuses on sacred art, mainly European Old Master paintings, but also includes smaller collections of sculpture, furniture, architectural elements, textiles, Greek and Russian icons, and ancient artifacts. As of 2017, the museum is closed for a planned move to downtown Greenville, SC.

History
Bob Jones Jr., son and successor of Bob Jones Sr. who founded the university, started collecting art in 1948. An acquisition fund was created to buy religious art from the western world to build a collection to serve both the University and South Carolina. The collection opened on Thanksgiving Day in 1951 with 25 paintings on display in two galleries next to the Bowen Collection of Antiquities. Even at this small beginning, the collection included works by Sandro Botticelli, Domenico Ghirlandaio, Tintoretto, Paolo Veronese, and Jusepe de Ribera. The collection grew rapidly, and in 1956 it moved to the new Fine Arts building. By 1962 it contained more than 200 works of art. The seven Benjamin West paintings from the Progress of Revealed Religion series (commissioned by King George III) were acquired in 1963, and in 1965 the collection again moved, this time to the former dining hall of the university. In 1996, M&G became an independent corporation and ultimately changed its name in 2019 to Museum & Gallery, Inc.

In 2008, the Museum opened a second, smaller location in downtown Greenville at Heritage Green; however due to a lack of visitors and the need to review the collection's expansion and future, M&G chose to close the satellite location in 2017.

Selected Old Master paintings

Italy
Francesco di Vannuccio, Crucifix
Bicci di Lorenzo, Madonna and Child with Angels
Niccolò di Pietro Gerini, Madonna and Child with Saints
Lorenzo di Niccolò di Martino, The Holy Trinity
Baldassare di Biagio del Firenze and Matteo Civitali, Madonna and Child with Saints
Master of the Greenville Tondo, Madonna and Child with Angels
Sandro Botticelli, Madonna and Child with an Angel
Pier Francesco Sacchi, The Adoration of the Shepherds
Giovanni Filippo Criscuolo, The Last Judgment
Francesco Granacci, Rest on the Flight into Egypt
Marco d'Oggiono, Madonna of the Lake
Ventura di Vincenzio Ulivieri, Ananias Restores Sight to Saul
Il Sodoma, Procession to Calvary
Andrea del Sarto, St. Sebastian
Giovanni Lanfranco, St. Cecilia
Tintoretto, The Visit of the Queen of Sheba to Solomon
Salvator Rosa, Landscape with the Baptism of Christ
Luca Giordano, Christ Cleansing the Temple
Rutilio di Lorenzo Manetti, Christ Disputing with the Elders
Carlo Dolci, Madonna and Child and The Repentant St. Peter
Mattia Preti, Christ Seats the Child in the Midst of the Disciples
Pompeo Batoni, St. James the Greater
Ginevra Cantofoli, A Sibyl
Domenichino, St. John the Evangelist
Guido Reni, St. Matthew
Giovanni Baglione, The Body of Christ Prepared for Burial
Giuseppe Bartolomeo Chiari, The Return from the Flight into Egypt
Sebastiano Conca, Justice and Temperance Overcoming Vice and Prudence and Fortitude Overcoming Evil
Alessandro Magnasco, Monks before a Fireplace

Northern Europe
Albrecht Bouts, The Man of Sorrows
Colijn de Coter, St. Michael the Archangel and St. Agnes
Master of the Holy Blood, Procession to Calvary
Gerard David, The Risen Christ
Master of St. Severin, Christ before Pilate
Juan de Flandes, St. Augustine and St. Roch
Jan Gossaert, The Virgin preparing the bath of the Child (also known as the Madonna of the Fireplace)
Lucas Cranach, the Elder, Joab Slays Abner and Salomé with the head of John the Baptist
Lucas Cranach, the Younger, Allegory on the Fall and Redemption of Man
Jan van Scorel, Christ and the Samaritan Woman
Jan van Amstel, called the Brunswick Monogrammist, Ecce Homo
Joachim Bueckelaer, The Holy Family
Jan Swart van Groningen, Nativity Triptych
Hans von Aachen, The Adoration of the Shepherds
Joos van Winghe, The Adoration of the Shepherds
Cornelis Cornelisz. van Haarlem, Christ Healing the Blind Man
Abraham Janssens, Lamentation over the Dead Christ
Peter Paul Rubens, Christ on the Cross
Gaspar de Crayer, St. Augustine
Gerrit van Honthorst, The Holy Family in the Carpenter Shop
Jan Hermansz. van Bijlert, St. Mary Magdalene Turning from the World to Christ
Anthony van Dyck, Madonna and Child
Matthias Stom, Lot Leaving Sodom
Jan Boeckhorst, The Adoration of the Magi
Govaert Flinck, Solomon’s Prayer for Wisdom
Gerbrand van den Eeckhout, Joseph Interpreting the Dreams of Pharaoh’s Butler and Baker
Jan Victors, Esther Accusing Haman

Spain
Vincente Juan Macip, Pentecost
Jusepe de Ribera, The Entombment of Christ and Ecce Homo
Francisco Herrera the Elder, St. Catherine of Alexandria Appearing to the Family of St. Bonaventura
Bartolomé Esteban Murillo, The Martyrdom of St. Andrew and The Heavenly Shepherd
José Antolínez, St. Michael the Archangel Overcoming Satan

France
Antoine de Lonhy, Presentation in the Temple
Trophime Bigot, St. Sebastian Aided by St. Irene
Simon Vouet, King David Playing the Harp and Salome with the Head of St. John the Baptist
Sébastien Bourdon, The Hiding of Moses
Philippe de Champaigne, The Christ of Derision
Charles Le Brun, Pentecost
François de Troy, Christ and the Samaritan Woman
Jean Baptiste Jouvenet, Christ with the Roman Centurion
Pierre Hubert Subleyras, Christ in the House of the Pharisee
Félix Louis Leullier, The Martyrdom of St. Perpetua and St. Felicitas

Great Britain
Edward Matthew Ward, Martin Luther Discovering Justification by Faith
Eyre Crowe, Wittenberg, October 31, 1517
Edwin Long, Vashti Refuses the King's Summons and Sir Henry Irving as Richard, Duke of Gloucester
Benjamin West, 7 paintings from the series "The Progress of Revealed Religion"
Frederic James Shields, Patience

United States
John Koch, Julius Weitzner

Gallery

Notes

External Links 

 Official Website

1951 establishments in South Carolina
Art museums established in 1951
Bob Jones University
Art museums and galleries in South Carolina
University museums in South Carolina